

Current listings

|}

References

 
Garfield